The Spoilers is a 1930 American Pre-Code Western film directed by Edwin Carewe and starring Gary Cooper, Kay Johnson, and Betty Compson. Set in Nome, Alaska during the 1898 Gold Rush, the film is about a gold prospector and a corrupt Alaska politician who fight for control over a gold mine. The film features a spectacular saloon fistfight between Cooper and William "Stage" Boyd.

The Spoilers was adapted to screen by Bartlett Cormack from the 1906 Rex Beach novel of the same name. Film versions also appeared in 1914, 1923, 1942, and 1955.

Plot
While traveling to Nome, Alaska, Roy Glenister (Gary Cooper) meets beautiful Helen Chester (Kay Johnson), who soon becomes his sweetheart. Glenister is one of several owners of a lucrative mine called The Midas. When he arrives in Nome, he discovers that his partners, Slapjack Simms (Slim Summerville) and Joe Dextry (James Kirkwood), are in the middle of a legal dispute with three corrupt officials: United States Marshal Voorhees (Jack Holmes), Judge Stillman (Lloyd Ingraham), and a politician named Alec McNamara (William "Stage" Boyd ). They have been engaged in a racket claiming titles to various mines, ejecting the miners, and then making McNamara owner of the disputed properties.

The three corrupt officials lay claim to The Midas. McNamara also steals money from Glenister, Dextry, and Slapjack, preventing them from enlisting legal help from the United States. When Dextry and Glenister plan a vigilante action, McNamara calls in a detail of soldiers to protect "his property". As Glenister and McNamara prepare for a gunfight, they are dissuaded by Helen, who suggests that the courts handle the dispute. Later, after jealous saloon owner Cherry Malotte (Betty Compson) lies to Glennister telling him that Helen and McNamara are conspiring to cheat him again, Glennister and McNamara settle their differences with a spectacular fistfight, with McNamara getting the worst. Afterwards, Glenister wins the hand of Helen.

Cast
 Gary Cooper as Roy Glenister
 Kay Johnson as Helen Chester
 Betty Compson as Cherry Malotte
 William "Stage" Boyd as Alec McNamara
 Harry Green as Herman
 Slim Summerville as Slapjack Simms
 James Kirkwood as Joe Dextry
 Lloyd Ingraham as Judge Stillman
 Oscar Apfel as Struve
 George Irving as William Wheaton
 Knute Erickson as Captain Stevens
 Merrill McCormick as Miner
 Charles K. French as Man in Bar
 Jack Holmes as Voorhees
 John Beck as Hanson

Production
The Spoilers was filmed on location in Oregon.

Reception
In his review for The New York Times, Mordaunt Hall gave the film a negative review for its poor narrative, unconvincing plot, and "absurdly melodramatic dialogue". Believing that the film would have benefitted from more details of the working for gold and fewer scenes in gambling halls and other places, Hall continued:

Finally, Hall criticized the film's "general lack of intelligence" and the narrative, which "runs from one scene to another with too much threatening talk and an ineffectual misunderstanding between Glenister and Helen Chester, who are in love with each other."

References

External links

 
 
 
 

1930 films
Films directed by Edwin Carewe
1930s English-language films
Films based on American novels
1930 Western (genre) films
Paramount Pictures films
Films based on Western (genre) novels
Films set in Alaska
American black-and-white films
American Western (genre) films
Films based on The Spoilers (Beach novel)
Remakes of American films
Sound film remakes of silent films
1930s American films